Channel Islands Harbor is a small craft harbor and shore-protection project in Oxnard, California at the southern end of the Santa Barbara Channel. It is the fifth largest harbor for small-craft recreation in the state of California and is a waterfront resort, recreation, and dining marketplace.  Recreational activities include diving, boat charters, sea kayaking, sportfishing, and whale watching (gray whales January through early April; blue and humpback whales July to September).

The five Channel Islands are a popular destination, the closest of which is Anacapa Island. The Ventura County Maritime Museum has a regularly rotating exhibit, maritime-themed art, and model ships. Water taxis are available to drop diners and shoppers at various docks within the harbor. Every three years the harbor is host to the Channel Islands Tall Ships Festival which includes between two and five large sailing vessels and draws thousands of visitors.

History
The US Army Corps of Engineers formed the harbor in 1960 by scooping out sand dunes and wetlands and depositing the surplus sand at the nearby beaches of Port Hueneme. The sand trap at the harbor entrance was designed to retain sand that otherwise might be diverted into the ocean due to the impacts of the construction of the Port of Hueneme. The sand was to be regularly dredged and placed on Hueneme Beach which suffers erosion due to the port blocking the littoral drift of sand.

While the County of Ventura arranged to oversee the harbor and manage it in 1963, they formed an agreement with the City of Oxnard to annex the then vacant county land and provide sewage service, water and utilities. The city built the infrastructure and under the agreement began to receive sales, property and lodging tax revenues. After the annexation agreement between the county and city had expired, the city stopped keeping up the parks, parking lots and restrooms in public areas in 2018. They also were no longer going to pay the water bills for these facilities. Oxnard harbor residents also elected to end payments to harbor patrol which ended an annual revenue stream. Ventura County Harbor Department patrols the main harbor which is south of the Channel Islands Boulevard bridge. The city of Oxnard maintains the northern neighborhood waterways.

Neighborhood and destinations
The harbor waters connect to the north with Mandalay Bay, a residential 129-unit waterfront development built in 1987. The development consists of single-family homes and townhouses with reinforced concrete bulkheads lining a series of short navigable canal-like waterways. Between 1950 and 1981 Mandalay Bay was a permitted oil field waste disposal site which caused the release of numerous hazardous chemicals. The records of what was dumped were subsequently lost, resulting in calls for an investigation and millions of dollars in lawsuits from home buyers who were told the area was safe for habitation.

The Channel Islands Boating Center opened in 2013. Great blue herons and white egrets nest in trees around the harbor.

References

Ports and harbors of California
Transportation buildings and structures in Ventura County, California